The George O. Stacy House is a historic house at 107 Atlantic Road in Gloucester, Massachusetts.  The elaborate Colonial Revival house now serves as part of the Bass Rocks Inn.  It was built in 1899 for George O. Stacy, a leading Gloucester real estate developer and hotel operator, and designed by Phillips & Halloran.  Although it was apparently built for Stacy and his wife to live in, they never did so because his wife objected to its remote location and seasonal isolation.  Stacy ended up using it as a rental property.

The house was listed on the National Register of Historic Places in 1982.

See also
National Register of Historic Places listings in Gloucester, Massachusetts
National Register of Historic Places listings in Essex County, Massachusetts

References

External links

Bass Rocks Ocean Inn website

Houses in Gloucester, Massachusetts
Houses on the National Register of Historic Places in Essex County, Massachusetts
Houses completed in 1899
Colonial Revival architecture in Massachusetts